The 1975–76 North Carolina Tar Heels men's basketball team represented the University of North Carolina at Chapel Hill.

Schedule

References

North Carolina Tar Heels men's basketball seasons
North Carolina
North Carolina
Tar
Tar